The Metropolitan Cathedral Church of St David, also known as St David's Cathedral, Cardiff, is a Roman Catholic cathedral in the city centre of Cardiff, Wales, and is the centre of the Roman Catholic Archdiocese of Cardiff. Located in Charles Street, the cathedral remains the focal point for Catholic life in Cardiff, and the country as a whole. It is one of only three Roman Catholic cathedrals in the United Kingdom that is associated with a choir school.

History 

The original church was built at a cost of £2,124 in 1842, after fundraising in Wales and Ireland and a donation by Lady Catherine Eyre of Bath. The church was located on David Street, Cardiff, and was dedicated to the patron saint of Wales, St David, at the request of Lady Eyre.

The current building was designed by Pugin and Pugin Architects and constructed 1884–87. It was Cardiff's principal Catholic church, and it became seat of the Roman Catholic Archbishop of Cardiff in 1916. In 1920, it was declared the cathedral church of the new Archdiocese of Cardiff.

The cathedral was destroyed by World War II bombing in March 1941 when incendiary bombs pierced the roof. During the 1950s it was restored and rebuilt, under the supervision of F. R. Bates, Son, and Price, and was re-opened in March 1959.

Music 
The Boys' Choir was established in 1959, and in recent years the choir has expanded, and now comprises 65 boys and girls, student choral scholars and professional lay clerks.

The cathedral boy choristers and girl choristers are educated at the Choir School in St John's College, Cardiff, founded by Dr David Neville in 1987 as the Choir-school to the Metropolitan Cathedral.

Dr David Neville, Founding Principal of the Choir School St John's College and Cathedral Director of Music and Organist 1980–2016, received the Papal Cross Pro Ecclesia et Pontifice in 1991 for his services to cathedral music, and in 1997 he was a first recipient of the Archbishop of Wales Award for Church Music, chaired by George Guest CBE. In December 2015, David received a Papal Knighthood of the Order of St Gregory in recognition of his lifetime of service. David's last service at the cathedral before his sudden death in April 2016 was a live broadcast on BBC Radio 4 in January before an audience of 1.6 million. As a composer, David wrote works on a vast scale for chorus and orchestra, including The Wreck of the Deutschland directed by the internationally renowned conductor Vernon Handley at Hereford Cathedral. He was commissioned by the Welsh Arts Council, the Elgar Festival and the BBC, and his compositions have been performed in BBC broadcast and at Westminster Abbey and St Paul's Cathedral. In the year 2000, David was commissioned to compose a royal fanfare for the National Millennium Service attended by Princes Charles, William and Harry.

Under the direction of Dominic Neville, the choir sings four annual concerts in Cardiff at St David's Hall and the Dora Stoutzker Concert Hall at the Royal Welsh College of Music and Drama, and at leading venues across the UK such as Westminster Abbey, Christ Church Cathedral Oxford and St Paul's Cathedral London. International tours have included performances at Notre Dame Cathedral and the Madeleine Paris, Madrid and El Escorial (Spain), and the cathedrals of Ghent and Bruges (Belgium), Haarlem (Netherlands) and Ribe (Denmark). The Choir has performed in collaboration with The Schola of Brompton Oratory London, Chamber Strings of Melbourne Australia, St Bavo Cathedral Choir in Haarlem, Netherlands, Tennessee Tech Chorale, Philadelphia Boys Choir, Uppingham School Choir, and Gonville and Caius Chapel Choir Cambridge. In a collaboration with conductor David Atherton, the trebles have sung in collaborations with BBC National Chorus of Wales and BBC National Orchestra of Wales (Britten Spring Symphony / Atherton) broadcast on BBC Radio 3. In 2012, the choir sang with The Tallis Scholars' performance of Tallis's forty-part motet Spem in Alium, conducted by Peter Phillips at St David's Hall. Other recent performances include singing for the Prince Charles at the Opening of the Cornerstone, where the choir sang from the David Neville Gallery.

Under the direction of Dominic Neville, the choristers appeared and sang in the 'Christmas Special' of BBC's Doctor Who and sang in the major Hollywood feature film One Chance. One of the choir's leading trebles, Dylan Oshnoei, also sang in the acclaimed BBC production The Hollow Crown.

The choirs can be heard in live broadcasts, on BBC Radio 4 before an audience of 1.6 million, and BBC Radio Wales.

The director of music is Jeffrey Howard.

Clergy

Current priests 
The Archbishop of Cardiff, Most Reverend Mark O'Toole, acts as the rector of the cathedral. Rev. Fr. Robert James assumes responsibility for the day-to-day life of the cathedral as Priest-in-Charge.

Past priests 
Cardiff Cathedral has had many priests in charge since its consecration in 1842.

 Rev. P. Millea
 Rev. T. Cody
 Rev. S. Bruno, IC (1874–1883)
 Very Rev. Mgr. William Williams (1884–1895)
 Rev. A. van den Heuvel (1896–1922)
In 1916 St David's Church became St David's Cathedral
 Very Rev. Canon D. J. Hannon (1923–1936)
 Very Rev. Canon William Coonan (1937–1941)
 Rt. Rev. Mgr. Peter F. Gavin (1941–1959)
 Rt. Rev. Mgr. John Crowe (1959–1963)
 Very Rev. Canon Bernard Cosulich (1963–1971)
 Rev. William Donovan (1971–1972)
 Very Rev. Canon Edwin Regan (1972–1985)
 Rev. Bernard Whitehouse (1985–2001)
 Very Rev. Canon Peter G. Collins (2001–2019)
 Rev Daniel J. Stanton (2019–2021)

References

External links 
 
 
 Cardiff Cathedral Choirs' Official Website
 Choir School: St John's College website

Roman Catholic cathedrals in Wales
Grade II listed churches in Cardiff
Grade II listed cathedrals in Wales
Roman Catholic churches completed in 1887
19th-century Roman Catholic church buildings in the United Kingdom
Roman Catholic Archdiocese of Cardiff
Roman Catholic churches in Cardiff
British churches bombed by the Luftwaffe